Extremadura is an autonomous community in western Spain.

Extremadura may also refer to:

 Extremadura UD, a Spanish football team 
 Extremadura Femenino CF, also known as CF Puebla Extremadura, a Spanish women's football club
 CF Extremadura, a Spanish football team, founded in 1924 but folded in 2010
 Extremadura (Vino de la Tierra), a Spanish geographical indication for Vino de la Tierra wines from Extremadura

See also
Estremadura (disambiguation)